Challenge is the magazine of the Young Communist League, the youth wing of the Communist Party of Britain. It was originally called Young Worker, and then Young Communist, before being re-established in 1935.

The magazine is to be confused with the historical Challenge which was, in its day, a primary publication of the Young People's Socialist League back when it was associated with the Socialist Party of America (YPSL is now politically and organisationally separate from the SPA).

History 
The first issue was published in March 1935, and it has been produced intermittently ever since. In the mid-1970s while the YCL was influenced by youth trends, the publication was re-designed to give it a punk zine aesthetic. When the Communist Party was re-established in 1988 as the Communist Party of Britain, the  published its magazine under the title Young Communist, however in 2000 it was renamed back to Challenge with issue №1 published in November/October that year. An online edition was launched in May 2020.

The magazine was sold outside factories and schools, alongside the Daily Worker. In 1971, each issue sold around 9000 times, and there were 17000 copies of the summer edition.

Aims 

Challenge aims to be the voice of Britain’s young communists reporting on the latest domestic and international news from a Marxist-Leninist and anti-imperialist perspective.

See also
 Young Communist League

References

External links
 Challenge website

Political magazines published in the United Kingdom
Young Communist League (Great Britain)
Magazines established in 1935
Marxist magazines